Inverted relief, inverted topography, or topographic inversion refers to landscape features that have reversed their elevation relative to other features.  It most often occurs when low areas of a landscape become filled with lava or sediment that hardens into material that is more resistant to erosion than the material that surrounds it.  Differential erosion then removes the less resistant surrounding material, leaving behind the younger resistant material, which may then appear as a ridge where previously there was a valley. Terms such as "inverted valley" or "inverted channel" are used to describe such features. Inverted relief has been observed on the surfaces of other planets as well as on Earth. For example, well-documented inverted topographies have been discovered on Mars.

Formation 
Several processes can cause the floor of a depression to become more resistant to erosion than its surrounding slopes and uplands: 
First, coarse-grained sediment, such as gravel, accumulates in the depression, i.e., a stream valley or lake basin. Next, wind erosion removes fine-grained sediments in areas adjacent to the depression. This leaves behind the more resistant coarse-grained sediments as a hill or ridge, while the channel switches to a lower lying area.
A fluvial valley might fill with volcanic material such as lava or welded tuff pouring into it. This would resist erosion while the surrounding surface is eroded away to create a ridge.
Cementation of underlying sediments by minerals dissolved in water may occur in a depression. On Earth, this often happens in stream valleys as the result of the formation of duricrusts, i.e., silcrete or ferricrete, by pedogenesis. Minerals for cementation can come from groundwater. It is thought that a low point like a valley focuses groundflow, so more water and cements move into it, and this results in a greater degree of cementation. Again, the cemented sediments would resist erosion while the surrounding terrain is eroded away to create a ridge or hill.
Erosion of the resistant upper strata of the anticlines of a folded region, exposing less resistant underlying strata, which then erode relatively rapidly leaving the syncline as the top of a mesa or ridge.

An example 
A classic example of inverted relief is Table Mountain, Tuolumne County, California. Multiple lava flows filled an ancient fluvial valley that cut westward through the central Sierra Nevada range to the Central Valley about 10.5 million years ago. These Miocene lava flows filled this ancient river valley with a thick sequence of potassium-rich trachyandesite lavas that are significantly more resistant to erosion than the Mesozoic siltstone and other rock in which the valley was cut. Thus, subsequent differential erosion left these volcanic rocks as a sinuous ridge, which now stands well above landscape underlain by more deeply eroded Mesozoic rocks.

Another example is Table Mountain, Cape Town, where the original high ridges of resistant quartzitic sandstone of the Cape Fold Belt were eroded away first, exposing less resistant rock, which eroded faster, leaving the original valley bottom at the top of the residual mountain.

On Mars 
Inverted relief in the form of sinuous and meandering ridges, which are indicative of ancient, inverted fluvial channels, is argued to be evidence of water channels on the Martian surface in the past. An example is Miyamoto Crater, which was proposed in 2010 as a potential location to be searched for evidence of life on Mars.

Other examples are shown in the photographs below.

Inverted terrain in Aeolis quadrangle

Inverted terrain in Syrtis Major quadrangle

Inverted terrain in Margaritifer Sinus quadrangle

Inverted terrain in Amazonis quadrangle

References

External links
Everything2.com: Topographic Inversion
MarsToday.com: Inverted Topography of Huo Hsing Vallis
MarsToday.com: NASA Mars Picture of the Day: Inverted channels
NASA: Inverted Topography, Patagonia, Argentina 
Utah Geological Survey: Inverted Topography in the St. George Area of Washington County
California State University Department of Geological Sciences: View of table mountain on eastern edge of the Sierra Nevada

Planetary geology
Surface features of Mars
Geomorphology
Mountain geomorphology
Erosion landforms